The Hot Potatoes software suite includes five applications that can create exercises for the World Wide Web. The applications are JCloze, JCross, JMatch, JMix and JQuiz. There is also a sixth application called The Masher, that will compile all the Hot Potatoes exercises into one unit.

Hot Potatoes was created by the Research and Development team at the University of Victoria Humanities Computing and Media Centre. Commercial aspects of the software are handled by Half-Baked Software Inc. Hot Potatoes has been freeware since October 2009.

Hot Potatoes was first released in version 2.0 in September 1998, at the EuroCALL conference in Leuven, Belgium.

References 
Stewart Arneil and Martin Holmes (1998). "Hot Potatoes: Free Tools for Creating Interactive Language Exercises for the World Wide Web". Presentation, EuroCALL 1998 conference, Leuven. September 1998.

Stewart Arneil and Martin Holmes (1999). "Juggling hot potatoes: Decisions and compromises in creating authoring tools for the Web". ReCALL Journal, Vol. 11 No. 2 (Web edition) and College and University Media Review, Vol. 6 No. 1. CUP; CCUMC. http://www.eurocall-languages.org/recall/pdf/rvol11no2.pdf. September 1999.

Stewart Arneil and Martin Holmes (2001). "Hot Potatoes, History and Future". Presentation, EuroCALL 2001 Conference, Nijmegen. http://web.uvic.ca/hrd/eurocall2001/HotPotPastFuture/PastFutureHome.htm. August 2001.

Stewart Arneil and Martin Holmes (2003). "Unicode and Software Development: Hot Potatoes Goes Multilingual". Presentation, WorldCALL 2003 Conference, Banff, Canada, May 2003; also IALLT 2003 Conference June 2003. http://web.uvic.ca/hrd/iallt2003/unicode/presentation.xml. May 2003.

Stewart Arneil and Martin Holmes (2004). "Hacking in Hot Potatoes: A little knowledge brings a lot of power". In TEL & CAL. CALL-Austria Assn. . January 2004.

Stewart Arneil and Martin Holmes (2008). "Hot Potatoes: Taking an academic software project into the commercial domain". In Aprendizaje de Lenguas Asistido por Ordenador: Herramientas de Autor para el Desarrollo de Cursos a Través de la Web, ed. Ana Gimeno Sanz, pp. 5–33. Editorial Universidad Politécnica de Valencia. http://www.upv.es/pls/obib/est_publ.FichPublica?P_ESTILO=200&P_IDIOMA=i&P_ARM=2154. https://books.google.com/books?id=kYF1QwAACAAJ&dq=Aprendizaje+de+Lenguas+Asistido+por+Ordenador:+Herramientas+de+Autor+para+el+Desarrollo+de+Cursos+a+Trav%C3%A9s+de+la+Web&hl=en&ei=JhrpTtw0yJSIAsfP7KcM&sa=X&oi=book_result&ct=result&resnum=1&ved=0CDcQ6AEwAA. 2008.

External links
 Hot Potatoes Home Page
 Half-Baked Software Home Page

Software for teachers